Luciano Biondini is an Italian jazz and folk music accordion player that has appeared on the albums of various musicians, including Gabriele Mirabassi, Fratelli Mancuso, Ivano Fossati, Samo Šalamon and Rabih Abou-Khalil.

Discography
as leader or co-leader
Terra Madre, (Enja Records 2005) w/ Javier Girotto
Prima Del Cuore, (Enja 2007)
 Biondini, Godard, Niggli - What Is There What Is Not (Intakt Records 2011)
Face To Face (Abeat Records 2013) w/ Fabio Bosso
La Strada Invisibile (ACT 2014) w/ Rita Marcotulli
Senza Fine (Intakt Records 2015)
Cinema Italia (Via Veneto Jazz 2016) w/ Rosario Giuliani, Enzo Pietropaoli, Michele Rabbia

Rabih Abou-Khalil - Morton's Foot (Enja, 2003)

Rabih Abou-Khalil - Em Português (Enja, 2008)

References

Italian folk musicians
Jazz accordionists
Living people
Year of birth missing (living people)
21st-century accordionists
Intakt Records artists
Columbia Records artists
Enja Records artists
ACT Music artists